Zoya Khan (17 April 1992) is an Indian actress, anchor and host. She began her career as an anchor and print model. She has done numerous commercials mostly for the print media and has also walked the ramp. She gained attention in a Delhi beauty pageant, where she won titles of Miss Beautiful Smile & smooth skin. Zoya worked as an accounts professional and also pursued a career in modelling before becoming an actress.

After a short stint with modelling, Zoya made her breakthrough with a short film titled "Machhar-Daani", for which she won best actress award for her outstanding performance, among 216 films screened from over 46 nations, in the Kolkata International Short Films Festival 2013. Zoya made her acting debut in South Indian cinema with a 2015 Telugu feature film A Shyam Gopal Varma Film, in a lead role, directed by C.S.Reddy. She also had a role in Shimla Mirchi, directed by Ramesh Sippy.

Early life
Zoya Khan was born to Muslim parents of Pashtun ancestry in New Delhi, India. Her father is an advocate. She completed her graduation in accounts honors from Delhi University and was actively involved in dramatics. She was the inter-school basketball and badminton player during her school and college days & is a painter by hobby. Her brother is a lawyer in Supreme court. She is a niece of Working President of Delhi Congress & Ex- Cabinet Minister Haroon Yusuf.

Career 
Zoya has been hosting & planning events and shows since her school days. As an emcee, she presented and executed numerous shows and live events, stage events, comedy shows, Asian Open Kick-boxing championship, musical concerts, entertainment shows, awards, weddings, fashion shows, documentaries, travel shows, corporate shows and New Year's Eves across India and abroad. She endorsed brands and appeared in commercials, mostly in print media, for companies like Fanta, Airtel, Fortis Healthcare, Bank of India, sterling holidays, L’Oreal, Satyapaul, Flying Machine, Warner Brothers, BlackBerry phones, Zaveri jewelers, Avon scooty bikes and Reebok. She moved to Mumbai, as she started getting events and acting assignments, to pursue her career.

Zoya Khan made her debut on the small screen during her studies, in an Ekta Kapoor television serial named Bairi Piya with Balaji Telefilms, in a negative role aired on Colors TV. She appeared in a Zee TV show Satrangi Sasural (International Title: 7 Bridges to Cross), in a parallel lead as Dr. Devika, who completes the love triangle. Zoya essayed a role of a lively, bubbly and fashionable character in a Reliance Broadcast Network rom-com show Love Dosti Dua, 2nd season of Jai Maa Vindhyavasini on BIG Magic channel, in a Lead role as ‘Tulika'. Set against the backdrop of showbiz, glitz, glamour where she quoted in a Tellychakkar interview that "It is very easy to emote or remain silent, but to make people laugh is a tough task.." and she loves playing comedy & thriller on screen.

Zoya appeared in a romantic SHORT FILM titled Machhar-Daani (a mosquito net) in 2014, for which she won BEST ACTRESS AWARD for her outstanding performance. She made her Film debut as a lead actress in a Telugu Feature Film A Shyam Gopal Varma Film, released in 2015. Post that she did a comedy heist film Life Ki Aisi Ki taisi, directed by Ejaz Khan which got released in 2017. Following which she completed filming Bollywood’s ace filmmaker Ramesh Sippy come back film Shimla Mirchi, where she played a lively & bubbly character 'Brownie', a bridal fashion designer from Shimla, starring Bollywood’s dream girl Hema Malini and Rajkummar Rao, which is released on 3 January 2020. Recently she has completed documentary for a travel channel and web series targeting the affluent metro youth in the digital arena.

Filmography

Films

Web series

References

External links
 
 
 

 Zoya Khan to Host Asian Open Kickboxing Championship 2010 to be held at Pune

Indian television actresses
Indian film actresses
Living people
1992 births